Greenwood Civic Center is a 4,800-seat multi-purpose arena in Greenwood, South Carolina.  It hosted various local concerts and sporting events for the area. It was designed by architect Dale Gilliland, AIA. Greenwood County Council voted to close the Civic Center in December 2009 and the building has been unoccupied since.
The Civic Center fell into disrepair and in the summer of 2015 was torn down.

References

Indoor arenas in South Carolina
Sports venues in South Carolina
Buildings and structures in Greenwood, South Carolina
Sports venues demolished in 2015
Demolished buildings and structures in South Carolina